A coverlet (earlier coverlid) is a fabric covering spread, usually for a bed, and may refer to:

Woven coverlet, a bed covering used in the United States from the colonial period to the mid-19th century
Duvet cover
Quilt
A type of altar cloth

See also
Bedding